Abraham Rademaker (1677 – 21 January 1735) was an 18th-century painter and printmaker from the Northern Netherlands.

Biography

Rademaker was born in Lisse.  According to the RKD he was a versatile artist who painted Italianate landscapes, but is known mostly for his many cityscapes and drawings of buildings that were made into print. The following list of illustrated publications contain his prints:  He died in Haarlem, aged about 57.
 , by Jacob van der Eyk
 , 1792–1803, by Mattheus Brouërius van Nidek; Isaak Le Long; J.H. Reisig
  (Published in French as ), 1728, by Abraham Rademaker
 , by Abraham Rademaker
 , 1770–1771, Mattheus Brouërius van Nidek; Isaak Le Long
 , by Abraham Rademaker

References

Abraham Rademaker on Artnet

1677 births
1735 deaths
18th-century Dutch painters
18th-century Dutch male artists
Dutch male painters
People from Lisse